Anatoli Kuzmich Ljutjuk (Ukrainian: Анатолій Кузьмич Лютюк; born 1947) is a Ukrainian-Estonian friar and artist of collaborative handmade books. He lives in Tallinn, Estonia, where he founded the city's Ukrainian Greek Catholic Church and the Ukrainian Cultural Center.

Ukrainian Cultural Center 

The Ukrainian Cultural Center is located in Tallinn, Estonia. Labora is the name of its studios, which include a calligraphy school, print shop, and handmade paper mill.

Artistic works 
In the early 2000s, Ljutjuk began to pray for the animals he saw in his Tallinn church courtyard and started making icons of Estonia's endangered species. In 2006, Estonian poet Timo Maran visited the Ukrainian Cultural Center and saw Ljutjuk's artwork. Maran was inspired to write poems about the endangered animals. Maran's poems, new illustrations by Lujutjuk's son, Nestor Lujutjuk, and calligrapher Heino Kivihall became Poetics of Endangered Species: Estonia.This was followed by Poetics of Endangered Species: Ukraine. Editions of both books were donated to the British Library.

Ljutjuk's next project was The Ark of Unique Cultures, with The Ark of Unique Cultures: The Hutsuls, created in 2014. It focuses on the Hutsuls, an ethnic group from western Ukraine and Romania. This book includes poems by Ukrainian poet Mariya Korpanyuk, plants collected from the Carpathian Mountains, and postcards designed by Ljutjuk with messages from Hutsul people.

Churches founded by Ljutjuk 

 Three Handed Mother of God Church, which is affiliated with the Ukrainian Cultural Center
 Virgin Mary Chapel, where people can pray for Estonia's nature

References

External links 

 Digitized copy of The Ark of Unique Cultures: The Hutsuls, via the National Library of Estonia
 Labora

1947 births
Living people
Members of the Ukrainian Greek Catholic Church
Ukrainian artists
20th-century Estonian male artists
21st-century Estonian male artists
Estonian Academy of Arts alumni
Recipients of the Order of the White Star, 5th Class
Ukrainian expatriates in Estonia
20th-century Ukrainian male artists
21st-century Ukrainian male artists
Ukrainian priests
People from Ternopil Oblast
Laureates of the Diploma of the Verkhovna Rada of Ukraine